The 2010 Ginetta Junior Championship season was the eighth season of the Ginetta Junior Championship. The season began at Thruxton on 3 April 2010 and concluded after 20 races over 10 events at Brands Hatch on 10 October 2010. The championship introduced the G40 model to replace the G20 for the 2010 season.

Hillspeed's Tom Ingram became champion after a strong run towards the end of the season which included weekend sweeps at Silverstone and Knockhill, as well as a season-opening victory at Thruxton. Ingram's success, which included eight other podium finishes to go with his five wins, came despite having one of the smallest budgets of all the grid. Ingram's championship-winning margin was 65 points over Tollbar driver Jake Hill, who won ten races but championship aspirations were thwarted by a disqualification at the Brands Hatch GP meeting, and accidents at Silverstone and Brands Hatch Indy. TJ Motorsport's Louise Richardson finished third with a pair of victories at Snetterton and Brands Hatch Indy, along with ten other podium finishes including a run of eight successive podium finishes during the middle part of the season. Her team-mate Jody Fannin got the better of Tom Howard, who was a TJ driver until mid-season when he joined Hill at Tollbar, for fourth and fifth places; Fannin took victories at Brands Hatch GP and Croft, while Howard took the other victory at Rockingham. Defending champion Sarah Moore struggled for consistency in the season, but three end-of-season podiums enabled her to finish seventh in the championship behind brother David.

Teams and drivers

Calendar
All rounds were held in the United Kingdom. The series supported the British Touring Car Championship at all rounds.

Standings

Ginetta Junior Winter Series
The 2010 Ginetta Junior Winter Series was the third Ginetta Junior Winter Series. The series was held over four rounds at Pembrey on the weekend of 13–14 November. It formed part of the British Automobile Racing Club Winter Series. The series was won by Hillspeed's Seb Morris, who took two wins. Second place went to privateer Max Coates, who took one win and third place went to Tockwith driver David Moore. Adam Bonham of Team Parker Racing took the other race victory.

Teams and drivers
All teams and driver were British-registered.

Calendar

References

External links
 Official website

Ginetta Junior
Ginetta Junior Championship seasons